Ngina Kenyatta (née Muhoho; born 24 June 1933), popularly known as "Mama Ngina", is the former First Lady of Kenya. She is the widow of the Kenya's first president, Jomo Kenyatta (~1889–1978), and mother of the fourth president Uhuru Kenyatta who served from 2013 to 2022.

Biography
Mama Ngina was born Ngina Muhoho to Chief Muhoho wa Gathecha and Anne Nyokabi Muhoho at Ngenda, Kiambu District, Central Province in 1933 . She married Jomo Kenyatta as his fourth wife in 1951, a union characterised as a "gift" to Kenyatta from his ethnic group, the Kikuyu. This became her reference as the "mother of the nation", becoming Mama Ngina Kenyatta, independent Kenya's glamorous First Lady when Kenyatta became president in 1964. She often accompanied him in public, and had some streets in Nairobi and Mombasa, as well as a Children's Home, named after her. In 1965, she became patron of Kenyan Guiding.

In the 1970s, she and other high-level government officials were allegedly involved in an ivory-smuggling ring which transported tusks out of the country in the state private airliner. A May 1975 edition of New Scientist cited her as one of Kenya's "ivory queens" but also asserted they could not be completely certain that these claims were true. However, New Scientist claimed that there was now documentary proof that at least one member of Kenya's royal family had shipped over six tons of ivory to Red China.

Mama Ngina became a Roman Catholic, and was known to attend Mass every Sunday in the Catholic mission with some of their children. She also became one of the richest individuals in Kenya, owning plantations, ranches, and hotels.

In October 2021, the Pandora Papers revealed that she bequeathed part of her fortune in 2017. She and her son Uhuru were unmasked as Client 13173 by the Pandora Papers. The report stated that the Kenyatta family had offshore investments including a company with assets worth at least $30 million.

Family
Jomo Kenyatta married four wives, Wahu Kenyatta, Edna Clarke, Grace Wanjiku, and Ngina Kenyatta. With Wahu, Kenyatta had Peter Muigai Kenyatta (1920-1979) and Margaret Rose Wambui (1928–2017). Edna's only child was Peter Magan Kenyatta. Grace passed away giving birth to her only child, Jane "Jeni" Gecaga (1950–).

Ngina's children include Kristina Wambui Pratt (1952–), Uhuru Kenyatta, Anna Nyokabi Muthama, and Muhoho Kenyatta. Uhuru Kenyatta unsuccessfully ran for president as President Moi's preferred successor in 2002 and is today Kenya's fourth President. Muhoho Kenyatta runs the family's vast business but lives out of the public limelight. During Jomo Kenyatta's exile at Lodwar and Maralal, Ngina stayed with him, as did their daughters, Jane and Wamboi. Mama Ngina is step-mother to Kenyatta's other three children, two by his first wife and one by the second.

Monsignor George Muhoho, Roman Catholic chaplain at University of Nairobi, is one of her brothers.

References

External links
 Portrait

1933 births
Living people
First ladies of Kenya
Spouses of prime ministers of Kenya
Jomo Kenyatta
Kenyan Roman Catholics
People from Kiambu County
Kikuyu people
Ngina